Lanthanum decahydride is a polyhydride or superhydride compound of lanthanum and hydrogen (LaH10) that has shown evidence of being a high-temperature superconductor. It has a superconducting transition temperature TC ~  at a pressure of 150 gigapascals (GPa), and its synthesis required pressures above ~160 GPa.

Synopsis
The compound exhibits a Meissner effect below the superconducting transition temperature.

The cubic form has each lanthanum atom surrounded by 32 hydrogen atoms, which form the vertices of an 18 faced shape called a chamfered cube.

A similar compound lanthanum boron octahydride was computationally predicted to be a superconductor at 126 K with a pressure of 50 GPa.

References

Lanthanum compounds
High-temperature superconductors